Liselotte Blumer (born 1957) is a retired female badminton player from Switzerland.

Career
In 1980 Blumer was a surprise winner of the women's singles gold medal at the European Badminton Championships. The powerfully built Blumer won the Swiss national women's singles title sixteen times, fifteen of them consecutively between 1973 and 1987, and the Swiss Open women's singles title six times. Her other international titles included the French Open women's doubles,  the Polish Open women's singles (1981, 1982), and the Malta International women's singles and doubles (1984).

References

Swiss female badminton players
1957 births
Living people
20th-century Swiss women